Michael Anton (born 1969) is an American conservative essayist, speechwriter and former private-equity executive who was a senior national security official in the Trump administration. Under a pseudonym he wrote "The Flight 93 Election", an influential essay in support of Donald Trump during the 2016 presidential campaign.

Anton was Deputy Assistant to the President for Strategic Communications on the National Security Council under Trump. He is a former speechwriter for Rupert Murdoch, Rudy Giuliani, and Condoleezza Rice, and worked as director of communications at the investment bank Citigroup and as managing director of investing firm BlackRock.

Life and career 
Anton is of Italian and Lebanese descent. He grew up in Loomis, California. He received his bachelor's degree from the University of California, Berkeley, and earned advanced degrees from St. John's College and the Claremont Graduate University.

Under the pseudonym "Nicholas Antongiavanni", Anton wrote The Suit, a 2006 men's fashion guide book, which is a parody of Niccolò Machiavelli's The Prince.

Anton joined the U.S. National Security Council as Deputy Assistant to the President for Strategic Communications in February 2017. He resigned on April 8, 2018, the evening before John R. Bolton became Trump's National Security Advisor.

Anton joined Hillsdale College's Kirby Center Graduate School of Government in Washington, D.C., after leaving the Trump administration.

In December 2020, Trump appointed Anton to a four-year term on the National Board for Education Sciences, which advises the Department of Education on scientific research and investments.

Views 
Anton is considered to be a notable West Coast Straussian, as a student of Leo Strauss by way of tutor Harry V. Jaffa, and he specializes in the study of Niccolò Machiavelli.

Anton has derided American diversity in his writing, arguing in a pseudonymous March 2016 essay that "'Diversity' is not 'our strength'; it's a source of weakness, tension and disunion."

In the same essay, written under the pseudonym Publius Decius Mus (after the ancient Roman consul), Anton defended Donald Trump's use of the slogan "America First"  by arguing that the America First Committee (which included prominent antisemites and opposed the United States entering World War II) had been "unfairly maligned." He also argued that Islam "is a militant faith", and that "only an insane society" would take in Muslim immigrants after the 9/11 attacks.

His pseudonymous September 2016 editorial "The Flight 93 Election", published in the Claremont Review of Books, compared the prospect of conservatives letting Hillary Clinton win the 2016 United States presidential election with passengers not charging the cockpit of the United Airlines aircraft hijacked by Al-Qaeda in the 9/11 attacks. In the essay, Anton criticized conservatives who were skeptical of Donald Trump, and he also decried the "ceaseless importation of Third World foreigners," called for "no more importing poverty, crime, and alien cultures", called the idea of Islamophobia and the Black Lives Matter movement "inanities", and argued that the American left was waging "wars on 'cis-genderism'". Rush Limbaugh devoted the bulk of a radio show in September 2016 to a reading of the editorial.

In Anton's 2019 book After the Flight 93 Election: The Vote that Saved America and What We Still Have to Lose, he argued that Trump constituted "the first serious national-political defense of the Constitution in a generation." Trump praised the book.

According to Carlos Lozada, book critic for The Washington Post, Anton's book primarily reprints text from his 2016 editorial, but with a newly added rumination of how dangerous the American left is. Lozada wrote, "Anton spends virtually no time detailing or defending particular policies of the Trump administration; all that matters is the enemy. For Anton, Hillary Clinton is no longer the chief nemesis—the entire left is, along with sellout conservatives and any other forces countering the president. They contribute to a 'spiritual sickness' and 'existential despair' pervading not just the United States but all the West ... Apparently, Flight 93 did not end with the 2016 vote; we are forever on the plane, endlessly in danger, no matter who has seized the controls."

Anton is also known as a critic of birthright citizenship in the United States, arguing that the Fourteenth Amendment to the United States Constitution does not mandate jus soli ("right of the soil") citizenship, and that the Amendment's use of the provision "subject to the jurisdiction thereof" excludes children born of illegal aliens. An analysis of Anton's arguments by Neil Goldfarb in Language Log  said they are predicated on a quotation from Senator Jacob Howard whose meaning Anton inverted by adding the word "or".

In September 2020, Anton wrote a conspiratorial essay titled "The Coming Coup?" in The American Mind; in the essay, Anton suggested that Democrats, aided by George Soros, were planning a coup d'etat to take over the United States by way of a domestic color revolution coordinated by the so-called Deep State and influential operatives of the Democratic Party. The widely shared article was called a tipping point in spreading the unfounded claim, which was further popularized by The Federalist, DJHJ Media and Dan Bongino.

Personal life 
Anton is a classically trained chef. After resigning from the National Security Council in 2018, he came back to the White House for a day to work as a line cook in the kitchen, helping prepare a state dinner for President Emmanuel Macron of France. He is also an aesthete with a penchant for classical men's tailoring and fashion, having authored a short book and over 40,000 posts on internet bulletin board Styleforum.net on the subject.

Books

References

External links 
 
 Michael Anton, Frum Forum, February 11, 2009 (link updated October 20, 2020).
 Christian Chensvold: Five Questions: For Nicholas Antongiavanni / Suiting up for men's power dressing, Interview, in: San Francisco Chronicle, June 18, 2006.
 Clothes Make the Man, Talk by Michael Anton, February 11, 2007.
 The Dandy, Interview with Bruce Cole, in: Humanities, official journal of the National Endowment for the Humanities, March/April 2008.
 
 

Trump administration personnel
Living people
1970 births
American critics of Islam
Claremont Graduate University alumni
American people of Lebanese descent
University of California, Davis alumni